Igreja Matriz da Golegã is a church in the town Golegã, Portugal. It is classified as a National Monument.

Churches in Santarém District
National monuments in Santarém District
Golegã